Whitestone is a residential neighborhood in the northernmost part of the New York City borough of Queens. The neighborhood proper is located between the East River to the north; College Point and Whitestone Expressway to the west; Flushing and 25th Avenue to the south; and Bayside and Francis Lewis Boulevard to the east.

Whitestone contains the subsection of Malba, which is bounded to the north by the East River, to the east by the Whitestone Expressway, to the south by 14th Avenue, and to the west by 138th Street. Malba was cited in a New York Times article as one of the few "elite enclaves" of Queens.

Whitestone is located in Queens Community District 7 and its ZIP Code is 11357. It is patrolled by the New York City Police Department's 109th Precinct. Politically, Whitestone is represented by the New York City Council's 19th District.

History

Whitestone
Dutch settlers derived the name of the town from limestone that used to lie on the shore of the river according to a popular tradition. This tradition is supported by 17th century wills and deeds, which may be found in The New York Genealogical and Biographical Record, that refer to "the white stone" as a local landmark and survey reference point. Whitestone got its name because the settlers discovered that Whitestone was built on white limestone.

The area was, in large part, the estate of Francis Lewis, a delegate to the Continental Congress and a signer of the Declaration of Independence. The estate was the site of an English raid during the Revolutionary War. Lewis was not present but his wife was taken prisoner and his house was burned to the ground. For a period of time Whitestone was called Clintonville after Dewitt Clinton, the former governor of New York; this etymology is present in the name of Clintonville Street, located in the neighborhood. In the late 19th century, many wealthy New Yorkers began building mansions in the area, on what had once been farmland or woodland. Rapid development of the area ensued in the 1920s, however, as trolley and Long Island Rail Road train service on the Whitestone Branch was expanded into the neighborhood. Although this rail service ended during the Great Depression, part of the right-of-way was later used by Robert Moses to help construct the Belt Parkway, which includes the Whitestone Expressway which runs along the southeast edge of the former Flushing Airport and through Whitestone. Flushing Airport has been abandoned since 1985.

Further development came with the building of the Bronx-Whitestone Bridge in 1939. The bridge measures 2,300 feet and was the fourth longest bridge in the world at the time of its construction.

Malba subsection

The name of the subsection of Malba in northern Whitestone is derived from the first letters of the surnames of its five founders of the Malba Land Company: Maycock, Alling, Lewis, Bishop, and Avis. Malba is considered part of Whitestone, one of the more affluent communities in Queens. Demographically, the population is mostly white and of European descent (Greek, Italian, Irish), as well as Jewish, with a small minority of Asian Americans. Most of the residential properties in Malba are large expensive homes.

The first known resident of the area known as present-day Malba was David Roe, who arrived from England in the 1640s. According to Clarence Almon Torrey's book, David Roe Of Flushing And Some Of His Descendants, Roe became a resident of Flushing circa 1666. In 1683, Roe was taxed upon owning  and thereafter increased his holdings substantially, ultimately acquiring the upland around what was to become Malba.  Roe's farm was on the east side of the bay, which was then known as "Roe's Cove". He was among the most well-to-do citizens of Flushing, owning lands, farm stock, carpenter's tools and two slaves. 

In 1786, John Powell purchased Roe's  parcel for 1,685 pounds, 6 shillings, and 8 pence. It has been reported that Roe lost his lands for his allegiance to the crown during the American War of Independence. Powell thereafter built a home and the cove was renamed "Powell's Cove", the name it bears today. During the 19th century, some of Powell's land passed into the hands of Harry Genet, a member of the Tammany Hall, New York City's infamous political machine. Powell's house was destroyed by fire in the 1890s.

During the second half of the 19th century, the Roe/Powell land passed to a succession of owners. A map dating from 1873 lists the Smiths, Biningers and Nostrands as landowners in the area. The Nostrand and Smith farms represented a large portion of what is Malba today. The area around Hill Court and 14th Avenue was known as "Whitestone Heights". In 1883 railroad service to Manhattan was extended on the "Whitestone and Westchester Railroad", later the Long Island Rail Road. The terminus of the Whitestone line was at "Whitestone Landing" (154th Street), a popular summer resort area during the late 19th century and early 20th century.

William Ziegler, a self-made industrialist and president of the Royal Baking Powder Company bought all these parcels in or about 1883 and his holdings became known as the "Ziegler Tract". Ziegler died on May 24, 1905, leaving his wife, Electa Matilda Ziegler (a philanthropist for the blind, among other things) and son, William Jr., then 14 years of age.

William S. Champ (Ziegler's former secretary) and W.C. Demarest (Mrs. Ziegler's nephew) (both to become among the first families residing in Malba) formed a Realty Trust to purchase the Ziegler tract from his estate for development purposes. Champ was vice president of the Realty Trust, and also one of the executors of Ziegler's estate. The Ziegler Tract had been appraised for $100,000 shortly after Ziegler's death. In the spring of 1906, the Realty Trust secured over 100 investors from New Haven, Guilford, Bridgeport, and other Connecticut towns, to the planned purchase of the Ziegler Tract. Obviously, this plan was modified and much larger properties were developed. The trust represented to the investors that the property could be purchased from the Ziegler estate for $640,000. Thereafter such Connecticut residents as Samuel R. Avis, Noble P. Bishop, George W. Lewis, David R. Alling and George Maycock were elected trustees (altogether these were the five names that combined to form the MALBA name) of the Malba Land Company. The true, lesser, amount paid to Ziegler's estate was not uncovered until 1912. (For a complete discussion of the Realty Trust's acquisition of the land and its subsequent defense of a lawsuit from the Malba Land Company, see Crowe v. Malba Land Co., 135 N.Y.S. 454, 76 Misc. 676 (Sup. Ct. Queens Co. 1912)).

Development slowly began in 1908. A railroad station on the Whitestone line was added where 11th Avenue sits today. The Champs and Demarests were among Malba's  first families to own homes in Malba. There were thirteen houses by the time of World War I and more than a hundred were built in the 1920s. The railroad station closed in 1932. The triangle by Malba Drive and 11th Avenue was dedicated as "Jane Champ Park" on November 16, 1969 and was renovated by the Malba Field and Marine Club in 2005.

Demographics

Based on data from the 2010 United States Census, the population of Whitestone was 30,773, a decrease of 583 (1.9%) from the 31,356 counted in 2000.

The racial makeup of the neighborhood was 68.1% (20,956) White, 0.8% (242) African American, 0.1% (18) Native American, 17.4% (5,362) Asian, 0.0% (2) Pacific Islander, 0.3% (90) from other races, and 1.1% (351) from two or more races. Hispanic or Latino of any race were 12.2% (3,752) of the population.

The entirety of Community Board 7, which comprises Flushing, College Point, and Whitestone, had 263,039 inhabitants as of NYC Health's 2018 Community Health Profile, with an average life expectancy of 84.3 years. This is longer than the median life expectancy of 81.2 for all New York City neighborhoods. Most inhabitants are middle-aged and elderly: 22% are between the ages of between 25 and 44, 30% between 45 and 64, and 18% over 65. The ratio of youth and college-aged residents was lower, at 17% and 7% respectively.

As of 2017, the median household income in Community Board 7 was $51,284. In 2018, an estimated 25% of Whitestone and Flushing residents lived in poverty, compared to 19% in all of Queens and 20% in all of New York City. One in seventeen residents (6%) were unemployed, compared to 8% in Queens and 9% in New York City. Rent burden, or the percentage of residents who have difficulty paying their rent, is 57% in Whitestone and Flushing, higher than the boroughwide and citywide rates of 53% and 51% respectively. Based on this calculation, Whitestone and Flushing are considered to be high-income relative to the rest of the city and not gentrifying.

Points of interest

Notable buildings in the community include St. Luke's Roman Catholic Church and Holy Trinity Roman Catholic Church. The Grace Episcopal Church, on Clintonville street, was built in 1858 on land donated by the family of Francis Lewis. The Whitestone Hebrew Centre consists of two buildings on Clintonville Street and was founded in 1929. The Russian Orthodox Church of St. Nicholas, with its distinctive great blue onion dome (added in 1991 after the Cold War, previous building from 1916), was built in 1968. The Greek Orthodox Church, Holy Cross, or "Timios Stavros", is located on 150th Street.

Economy
The following companies currently operate or have operated out of Whitestone:
 Kinemacolor
 Fairchild Recording Equipment Corporation founded by Sherman Fairchild
 Lee Kum Kee International Holdings Ltd.
 Glacéau
 White Rock Beverages
 World Journal
 Queens Tribune

Police and crime
Flushing, College Point, and Whitestone are patrolled by the 109th Precinct of the NYPD, located at 37-05 Union Street. The 109th Precinct ranked 9th safest out of 69 patrol areas for per-capita crime in 2010. , with a non-fatal assault rate of 17 per 100,000 people, Whitestone and Flushing's rate of violent crimes per capita is less than that of the city as a whole. The incarceration rate of 145 per 100,000 people is lower than that of the city as a whole.

The 109th Precinct has a lower crime rate than in the 1990s, with crimes across all categories having decreased by 83.7% between 1990 and 2018. The precinct reported 6 murders, 30 rapes, 202 robberies, 219 felony assaults, 324 burglaries, 970 grand larcenies, and 126 grand larcenies auto in 2018.

Fire safety 
Whitestone contains a New York City Fire Department (FDNY) fire station, Engine Co. 295/Ladder Co. 144, at 12-49 149th Street Whitestone, NY 11357.

Health
, preterm births and births to teenage mothers are less common in Whitestone and Flushing than in other places citywide. In Whitestone and Flushing, there were 63 preterm births per 1,000 live births (compared to 87 per 1,000 citywide), and 8 births to teenage mothers per 1,000 live births (compared to 19.3 per 1,000 citywide). Whitestone and Flushing have a higher than average population of residents who are uninsured. In 2018, this population of uninsured residents was estimated to be 14%, slightly higher than the citywide rate of 12%.

Thirteen percent of Whitestone and Flushing residents are smokers, which is lower than the city average of 14% of residents being smokers. In Whitestone and Flushing, 13% of residents are obese, 8% are diabetic, and 22% have high blood pressure—compared to the citywide averages of 22%, 8%, and 23% respectively. In addition, 15% of children are obese, compared to the citywide average of 20%.

Ninety-five percent of residents eat some fruits and vegetables every day, which is higher than the city's average of 87%. In 2018, 71% of residents described their health as "good," "very good," or "excellent," lower than the city's average of 78%. For every supermarket in Whitestone and Flushing, there are 6 bodegas.

The nearest major hospitals are NewYork–Presbyterian/Queens and Flushing Hospital Medical Center.

Post offices and ZIP Code
Whitestone is covered by the ZIP Code 11357. The United States Post Office operates two post offices nearby:

 Whitestone Station – 14-44 150th Street
 Linden Hill Station – 29-50 Union Street

Education 
Whitestone and Flushing generally have a similar rate of college-educated residents to the rest of the city . While 37% of residents age 25 and older have a college education or higher, 23% have less than a high school education and 40% are high school graduates or have some college education. By contrast, 39% of Queens residents and 43% of city residents have a college education or higher. The percentage of Whitestone and Flushing students excelling in math rose from 55% in 2000 to 78% in 2011, and reading achievement rose from 57% to 59% during the same time period.

Whitestone and Flushing's rate of elementary school student absenteeism is less than the rest of New York City. In Whitestone and Flushing, 9% of elementary school students missed twenty or more days per school year, lower than the citywide average of 20%. Additionally, 86% of high school students in Whitestone and Flushing graduate on time, more than the citywide average of 75%.

Schools
The New York City Department of Education operates public schools in the area, including P.S. 79 Francis Lewis, P.S. 184 Flushing Manor, J.H.S. 194 William H. Carr, P.S. 193 Alfred J Kennedy, and  P.S. 209 Clearview Gardens.

Private elementary/middle schools include Holy Trinity Catholic Academy and St Luke's School.

Private secondary schools include Whitestone Academy (grades 8–12) and The Lowell School (grades 3–12).

The Queens Public Library's Whitestone branch is located at 151-10 14th Road.

Transportation

The Bronx–Whitestone Bridge gives access to and from the Bronx, as Whitestone is located across the East River from the Bronx. The Bronx-Whitestone Bridge carries I-678 (Whitestone Expressway) across the East River. The Cross Island Parkway merges into the Whitestone Expressway approximately  before the bridge. On the Bronx side, the bridge leads directly into the Bruckner Interchange, the northern terminus of I-678, where the Cross Bronx Expressway (I-95 to the west, I-295 to the east), Bruckner Expressway (I-278 to the west, I-95 to the east), and Hutchinson River Parkway meet. The segment of I-678 between the bridge and the Bruckner Interchange is a depressed freeway.

New York City Bus and MTA Bus Company serve Whitestone on the  local routes and the  routes. Most of the local buses provide access to and from Flushing–Main Street on the IRT Flushing Line of the New York City Subway. No subway service directly serves this neighborhood.

The Whitestone Branch was a branch of the Long Island Rail Road, running north and east from Flushing. It ran north along Flushing Bay and east along the East River to Whitestone. Originally intended to lead into Westchester County, it was consolidated into the Long Island Rail Road in 1876. Stations consisted of Flushing–Bridge Street, College Point, Malba, Whitestone–14th Avenue, and Whitestone Landing at 155th Street, which later became the Beechhurst Yacht Club. Flushing–Bridge Street Station was built in 1870, College Point, and Whitestone–14th Avenue stations were opened in 1869, and Whitestone Landing Station was built in 1886, all by the F&NS Railroad. Malba station was built in 1909 by the LIRR. The line was abandoned on February 15, 1932, despite efforts by affected commuters to turn the line into a privately operated shuttle route.

Notable people 
Notable current and former residents of Whitestone (including Beechhurst and Malba):

 Gracie Allen (1895–1964), actress and comedian
 Roberto Alomar (born 1968), retired Major League Baseball second baseman
 Lottie Alter (1871-1924, actress 
 Fatty Arbuckle (1887–1933), actor
 Tony Avella (born 1951), NY State Senator
 Ernest Ball (1878–1927), singer and songwriter
 Jill E. Barad (born 1951), former CEO of Mattel
 Minnette Barrett (1880–1964), actress
 Richard Bassford (born 1936), artist
 Mike Baxter (born 1984), Major League Baseball outfielder
 Willow Bay (born 1963), TV correspondent
 Denis Belliveau (born 1964), photographer, author and explorer
 Bertha Belmore (1882–1953), actress
 Robert Benchley (1889–1945), actor and newspaper columnist
 Armando Benitez (born 1972), retired Major League Baseball relief pitcher
 Warren Berger (born 1958), journalist
 Maurice Black (1891–1938), actor
 Tex Blaisdell (1920–1999), cartoonist
 Constance Binney (1896–1989), actress
 Clara Bow (1905–1965), actress
 Borden Parker Bowne (1847–1910), Christian philosopher and theologian
 Sully Boyar (1924–2001), actor
 Harry C. Bradley (1869-1947), actor 
 Edward C. Braunstein (born in 1981), member of the New York State Assembly
 Elton Britt (1913–1972), country singer
 Margaret Wise Brown (1910–1952), children's book author
 Roscoe Brown (1922–2016), Tuskegee Airman
 Floyd Buckley (1877–1956), actor
 George Burns (1896–1996), actor and comedian
 The Carpio Sextuplets (born 2008), first Hispanic sextuplets to be born in the United States
 Penelope Casas (1943–2013), cookbook author
 Edmar Castañeda (born 1978), harpist
 John Cena (born 1977), wrestler
 Whittaker Chambers (1901–1961), writer, editor and Soviet spy
 Charlie Chaplin (1889–1977), actor
 John Charles (1885–1921), actor
 Julie Chen (born 1970), journalist
 H. Cooper Cliffe (1862–1939), actor
 Andrew Climie (1834–1897), businessman and politician
 DeWitt Clinton (1769–1828), Mayor Of New York City
 Stuart Cohn, TV producer
 Charles S. Colden (1885–1960), Queens Supreme Court Justice, Founder of Queens College
 Wilson Collison (1893–1941), author and playwright
 Ben Cooper (1933–2020), actor
 Alice Crimmins (born 1939), convicted murderer
 Dorothy Dalton (1893–1972), actress
 Gussie Davis (1863–1899), songwriter
 Frederic De Belleville (1855–1923), actor
 Drea de Matteo (born 1972), actress
 Doris Doscher (1882–1970), actress and model
 Simeon Draper (1804–1866), chairman of the New York Republican State Committee
 J. Malcolm Dunn (1869–1946), actor
 Eddie Egan (1930–1995), NYPD detective
 Dustin Farnum (1874–1929), singer, dancer, and actor
 Fred Fear, founder of Fred Fear & Company
 Tom Fexas (1941–2006), yacht designer
 Harvey Samuel Firestone (1868–1938), businessman, founder of Firestone Tire and Rubber Company
 The Fleshtones, garage rock band
 Hazel Forbes (1910–1980), actress
 John Frankenheimer (1930–2002), film director
 Adam Garner (1898–1969), pianist and composer
 Paulette Goddard (1910–1990), actress
 Stan Goldberg (1932–2014), comic book artist
 Brian Gorman (born 1959), umpire in Major League Baseball
 Tom Gorman (1919–1986), umpire in Major League Baseball
 Oscar Graeve, writer for the Saturday Evening Post
 Jimmy Greco, Grammy nominated producer
 Angela Greene (1921–1978), actress
 Michael Greenfield (born 1963), racing driver
 Dan Halloran (born 1971), former member of the New York City Council
 Arthur Hammerstein (1872–1955), Broadway producer, uncle of Oscar Hammerstein II
 Charles Henry Hansen (1913–1995), music publisher
 Frank Harding, music publisher
 Lumsden Hare (1874–1964), actor
 Heart Attack, hardcore punk band
 Holmes Herbert (1882–1956), actor
 Alexander Herrmann (1844–1896), magician
 Christopher Higgins (born 1983), New York Rangers forward
 Frank T. Hines (1879–1960), chief of the U.S. Veterans Bureau
 Willie and Eugene Howard, comedy duo
 Harry Houdini (1874–1926), magician
 Graham Ingels (1915–1991), illustrator
 John William Isham (1866–1902), vaudevillian
 Burl Ives (1909–1995), actor and singer
 Chic Johnson (1891–1962), actor and comedian
 Howard Johnson (born 1960), retired Major League Baseball third baseman
 Selene Johnson (1976–1960), actress
 Helen Kane (1904–1966), singer
 Artie Kaplan (born 1935), musician, singer-songwriter and saxophonist
 Katerina Katakalides (born 1998), model and 2016 Teen Miss New York
 Buster Keaton (1895–1966), actor and director
 Kick Kelly (1856–1926), catcher, manager and umpire for Major League Baseball
 Alfred J. Kennedy (1877–1944), politician
 Andy Kindler (born 1956), actor and comedian
 Robert A. Kindler, business executive
 John Reed King (1914–1979), radio and television host
 Eugene Kohn, opera conductor
 Winifred Kingston (1894–1967), actress
 Charles Kramer (1916–1988), lawyer
 Fiorello H. La Guardia (1882–1947), Mayor of New York City
 Joey "Fitness" Lasalla, contestant on The Amazing Race
 Brian Lehrer (born 1952), radio talk show
 Warren Lehrer, author and artist
 Mickey Leigh (born 1954), musician and author, brother of Joey Ramone
 Murray Leinster (1896–1975), science fiction author
 Francis Lewis (1713–1802), Declaration Of Independence signer
 Ronnie the Limo Driver from the Howard Stern radio show
 Tommy Lucchese (1899–1967), mobster
 Charles Hill Mailes (1870–1937), actor
 Thalia Mara (1911–2003), ballet educator
 Jesse Malin (born 1967), musician
 D. Keith Mano (1942–2016), author, TV screenwriter and journalist
 Patricia Marmont (1921–2020), actress
 Percy Marmont (1883–1977), actor
 Stella Mayhew (1874–1934), actress
 John Maynard (1786–1850), lawyer and politician
 Bobby McDermott (1914–1963), basketball player and coach
 Claire McDowell (1877–1966), actress
 John McHugh Sr. (1924–2019), World War II veteran
 Beryl Mercer (1882–1939), actress
 Matthew J. Merritt (1895–1946), member of the U.S. House of Representatives
 Malcolm Moran, sportswriter
 Clara Morris (1848–1925), actress
 Andy Narell (born 1954), jazz musician and composer
 Jill Nicolini (born 1978), reporter and former model, actress, and reality TV show participant
 Daniel A. Nigro, FDNY Fire Commissioner
 John Nihill (1850–1908), U.S. Army soldier
 Gloria Okon, TV personality
 Bianca Pappas, first Miss Whitestone United States 2011, and later competed in Miss New York USA
 Ishle Yi Park, poet
 Norman Parsons (1931–2013), former mayor of Sea Cliff, New York
 Anne Paolucci (1926–2012), author and literary scholar
 Tom Patricola (1891–1950), actor, comedian and dancer
 Ann Pennington (1893–1971), actress, dancer and singer
 Lila Perl, author
 Mary Pickford (1892–1979), actress
 Lew Pollack (1895–1946), songwriter
 Joshua Prager, physician
 Dee Dee Ramone (1951–2002), Ramones bassist
 Nicholas Rescher (born 1928), philosopher
 Harry Richman (1895–1972), actor and singer
 Artie Ripp (born 1940), music industry executive, entrepreneur and record producer
 Richard Roth (born 1955), journalist
 Douglas Rushkoff (born 1961), media theorist, writer, columnist, lecturer, graphic novelist, and documentarian
 George Santos (born 1988), politician and businessman 
 Gia Scala (1934–1972), actress
 Joseph M. Schenck (1878–1961), film producer
 John F. Scileppi (1902–1987), judge of the New York Court of Appeals
 Charles H. Sneff (1841–1911), sugar merchant
 William Shea (1907–1991), lawyer, founder of the Continental League, namesake for Shea Stadium
 Flora Sheffield, actress
 Claire Shulman (1926–2020), former Queens Borough President
 Fred Spira (1924–2007), inventor
 Vincent Starrett (1886–1974), author and newspaperman
 Leonard P. Stavisky (1925–1999), New York State Senator
 Toby Ann Stavisky (born 1939), New York State Senator
 William Stickles (1882–1971), composer
 Norma Talmadge (1894–1957), actress
 Howard Thurston (1869–1936), magician
 Mike Tirico (born 1966), sportscaster
 Carmine Tramunti (1910–1978), Underworld crime figure
 Herb Turetzky (1945–2022), official scorer for the Brooklyn Nets for 54 years, including all of its incarnations, starting with the franchise's inaugural game in 1967.
 Walter Underhill (1795–1866), member of the United States House of Representatives
 Rudolph Valentino (1895–1926), actor
 Christina Vidal (born 1981), singer and actress
 Lisa Vidal (born 1965), actress
 Tanya Vidal (born 1971), actress, writer, director and producer
 Percival Vivian (1890–1961), actor
 Arthur W. Wallander (1892–1980), former New York City Police Commissioner
 Benjamin Ward (1925–2002), former New York City Police Commissioner
 Jacob B. Warlow (1818–1890), law enforcement officer, detective and police captain in the New York Police Department
 John B. Watson (1878–1958), psychologist
 Hy Weiss (1923–2007), record producer
 Walt Whitman (1819–1892), poet
 Charles Yerkow (1912–1994), author
 John Lloyd Young (born 1975), singer, actor and composer
 Peter Zaremba, musician and TV host
 Jane Breskin Zalben (born 1951), author and illustrator

In popular culture
TV shows filmed in, or set in, Whitestone include:
 A scene in the season five episode "Where's Johnny?" of The Sopranos was filmed in a bar in Whitestone formerly known as "Fiddler's Green".
 The character of Barbara Lorenz from The Cosby Mysteries, played by Lynn Whitfield, is originally from Whitestone.

Movies filmed in Whitestone include:
 Cruise (2018)
 Show Me a Hero (2014)
 A Walk Among the Tombstones (2014)
 Pride and Glory (2008)
 Dear J (2008)
 Dummy (2002)
 Boiler Room (2000); a scene was filmed in the same bar as "Where's Johnny?".
 Celebrity (1998)
 Shaft in Africa (1973)
 Taking Off (1971)

See also

 Francis Lewis
 List of Queens neighborhoods
 Whitestone Point Light

References
General

Specific

External links

 We Love Whitestone Civic Association
 Malba community website
 Forgotten New York - Long Island Rail Road Whitestone & Westchester Branch
 Forgotten New York - The Whitestone Neighborhood
 Mets Sandlot Baseball League - Youth Baseball as it oughta be....

 
Former villages in New York City
Neighborhoods in Queens, New York